is a former Japanese football player. She played for Japan national team.

Club career
Nagae played for L.League club Nikko Securities Dream Ladies.

National team career
On August 21, 1994, Nagae debuted for Japan national team against Austria.

National team statistics

References

Year of birth missing (living people)
Living people
Japanese women's footballers
Japan women's international footballers
Nadeshiko League players
Nikko Securities Dream Ladies players
Women's association football defenders
Asian Games medalists in football
Asian Games silver medalists for Japan
Footballers at the 1994 Asian Games
Medalists at the 1994 Asian Games